Rubén Sellés Salvador (born 15 June 1983) is a Spanish football coach who is the manager of Premier League club Southampton.

With coaching experience in Greece, Russia, Azerbaijan, Denmark, Spain and England, Sellés has a Master's degree in Sports & Physiology from the University of Valencia, and graduated from UEFA's Pro Licence programme aged 25.

Career 
Sellés began his coaching career as a fitness coach at Greek club Aris Thessaloniki. Sellés departed in 2009 to perform a similar role for the Villarreal youth team.

In 2010, Sellés travelled to Russia, acting as assistant manager to Aleksandr Pobegalov at Shinnik Yaroslavl.

In July 2011, Sellés returned to Aris, this time as assistant manager. The following season joining Neftchi Baku, remaining as assistant manager there for two seasons under managers Boyukagha Hajiyev, Arif Asadov, Nazim Suleymanov and Tarlan Ahmadov.

Sellés then spent two years at Norwegian club Strømsgodset Toppfotball, working as Chief Data Analyst.

In 2015, Sellés was appointed assistant to manager Gurban Gurbanov at Qarabağ.

In July 2018, Sellés joined Danish club Aarhus GF, assisting manager David Nielsen for two seasons, helping AGF to their first trophy win in over 20 years (Winners of the prestigious Atlantic Cup title in Portugal), before leaving to manage the Valencia U18 squad.

On 1 January 2021, Sellés joined F.C. Copenhagen as assistant manager to Jess Thorup.

Southampton
On 10 June 2022, Sellés departed Copenhagen to join Premier League club Southampton, as assistant to Ralph Hasenhüttl. On 7 November, Hasenhüttl was sacked by Southampton, and Sellés was placed in caretaker charge of the club. Sellés took charge of one match for The Saints before the appointment of new manager Nathan Jones, a 1–1 draw against Sheffield Wednesday in the EFL Cup on 9 November - in which Southampton advanced to the next round after a penalty shootout. 

He again took temporary charge of the team after Jones was sacked in February 2023. His first game in charge was a 1–0 away victory over Chelsea. On 24 February, Sellés was appointed manager until the end of the 2022–23 season.

Managerial statistics

References 

1983 births
Living people
Premier League managers
Southampton F.C. managers
Southampton F.C. non-playing staff
Sportspeople from Valencia
Association football coaches
Villarreal CF non-playing staff
Aris Thessaloniki F.C. non-playing staff
Strømsgodset Toppfotball non-playing staff
Aarhus Gymnastikforening non-playing staff
Valencia CF non-playing staff
F.C. Copenhagen non-playing staff
Spanish expatriate sportspeople
Spanish expatriate sportspeople in Azerbaijan
Spanish expatriate sportspeople in Norway
Spanish expatriate sportspeople in England
Spanish expatriate sportspeople in Denmark
Spanish expatriate sportspeople in Greece
University of Valencia alumni
Spanish football managers